In the Philippines, provinces are one of its primary political and administrative divisions. There are 82 provinces at present, which are further subdivided into component cities and municipalities. The local government units in the National Capital Region, as well as independent cities, are independent of any provincial government. Each province is governed by an elected legislature called the Sangguniang Panlalawigan and an elected governor.

The provinces are grouped into seventeen regions based on geographical, cultural, and ethnological characteristics. Thirteen of these regions are numerically designated from north to south, while the National Capital Region, the Cordillera Administrative Region, the Southwestern Tagalog Region, and the Bangsamoro Autonomous Region in Muslim Mindanao are only designated by acronyms.

Each province is a member of the League of Provinces of the Philippines, an organization which aims to address issues affecting provincial and metropolitan government administrations.

Government 
A provincial government is autonomous of other provinces within the republic. Each province is governed by two main elected branches of the government: executive and legislative. Judicial affairs are separated from provincial governance and are administered by the Supreme Court of the Philippines. Each province has at least one branch of a Regional Trial Court.

Executive 

The provincial governor is chief executive and head of each province. Elected to a term of three years and limited to three consecutive terms, he or she appoints the directors of each provincial department which include the office of administration, engineering office, information office, legal office, and treasury office.

Legislative 

The vice governor acts as the president for each Sangguniang Panlalawigan (SP; "Provincial Board"), the province's legislative body. Every SP is composed of regularly elected members from provincial districts, as well as ex officio members. The number of regularly elected SP members allotted to each province is determined by its income class. First- and second-class provinces are provided ten regular SP members; third- and fourth-class provinces have eight, while fifth- and sixth-class provinces have six. Exceptions are provinces with more than five congressional districts, such as Cavite with 16 regularly elected SP members, and Cebu, Negros Occidental and Pangasinan which have twelve each.

Every SP has designated seats for ex officio members, given to the respective local presidents of the Association of Barangay Captains (ABC), Philippine Councilors' League (PCL), and Sangguniang Kabataan (SK; "Youth Council").

The vice governor and regular members of an SP are elected by the voters within the province. Ex officio members are elected by members of their respective organizations.

Relation to other levels of government

National government 
National intrusion into the affairs of each provincial government is limited by the Philippine Constitution.  The President of the Philippines however coordinates with provincial administrators through the Department of the Interior and Local Government.  For purposes of national representation, each province is guaranteed its own congressional district.  One congressional representative represents each district in the House of Representatives. Senatorial representation is elected at an at-large basis and not apportioned through territory-based districts.

Cities and municipalities 

Those classified as either "highly urbanized" or "independent component" cities are independent from the province, as provided for in Section 29 of the Local Government Code of 1991. Although such a city is a self-governing second-level entity, in many cases it is often presented as part of the province in which it is geographically located, or in the case of Zamboanga City, the province it last formed part the congressional representation of.

Local government units classified as "component" cities and municipalities are under the jurisdiction of the provincial government. In order to make sure that all component city or municipal governments act within the scope of their prescribed powers and functions, the Local Government Code mandates the provincial governor to review executive orders issued by mayors, and the Sangguniang Panlalawigan to review legislation by the Sangguniang Panlungsod (City Council) or Sangguniang Bayan (Municipal Council), of all component cities and municipalities under the province's jurisdiction.

Barangays 
The provincial government does not have direct relations with individual barangays. Supervision over a barangay government is the mandate of the mayor and the Sanggunian of the component city or municipality of which the barangay in question is a part.

Classification  

Provinces are classified according to average annual income based on the previous 4 calendar years. Effective July 29, 2008, the thresholds for the income classes for cities are:

A province's income class determines the size of the membership of its Sangguniang Panlalawigan, and also how much it can spend on certain items, or procure through certain means.

List

Former provinces 
 Manila (until 1901) Incorporated into Rizal; portions around Manila later consolidated to form present-day NCR.
 Lepanto-Bontoc (1902–1908) Incorporated into Mountain Province.
 Moro Province (1903–1913) Converted to the Department of Mindanao and Sulu, composed of seven provinces. Now part of several regions in Mindanao.
 Ambos Camarines (1901–1908) Divided into Camarines Norte and Camarines Sur, although the wording of Act No. 2809 implies Camarines Norte was created from Ambos Camarines, the remainder of which was renamed Camarines Sur. Camarines Sur retained the provincial capital of Nueva Caceres.
 Misamis (1901–1939) Partitioned into Misamis Occidental and Misamis Oriental. Misamis Oriental retained the provincial capital of Cagayan.
 Mindoro (1902–1950) Divided into Occidental Mindoro and Oriental Mindoro. Oriental Mindoro retained the provincial capital of Calapan.
 Zamboanga (1914–1952) Partitioned into Zamboanga del Norte and Zamboanga del Sur. The de jure provincial capital of Molave was placed under the jurisdiction of Zamboanga del Sur which had its capital in Pagadian. Zamboanga Sibugay later created from Zamboanga del Sur.
 Lanao (1914–1959) Divided into Lanao del Norte and Lanao del Sur. Lanao del Sur retained the provincial capital of Dansalan (now Marawi).
 Surigao (1901–1967) Partitioned into Surigao del Norte and Surigao del Sur. Surigao del Norte retained the provincial capital of Surigao City and the provincial seal. The province of Dinagat Islands was later created from Surigao del Norte.
 Davao (1914–1967; 1972–1998) Divided into Davao del Norte, Davao del Sur and Davao Oriental. Davao del Norte was officially known as Davao from 1972 to 1998, when Compostela Valley (now Davao de Oro) was later created from Davao province. Davao Occidental later created from Davao del Sur.
 Agusan (1907–1967) Partitioned into Agusan del Norte and Agusan del Sur. Agusan del Norte retained the former provincial capital of Butuan. The provincial capital was officially transferred to Cabadbaran in 2000 but the provincial government services and functions are yet to be completely transferred to the new capital.
 Negros del Norte (1985–1986) Batas Pambansa Blg. 885, which created a new province out of the northern part of Negros Occidental, took effect on December 23, 1985, with a plebiscite to ratify the law held on January 3, 1986. The province comprised the present-day cities of Cadiz (which was to serve as the capital), Escalante, Sagay, San Carlos, Silay and Victorias, as well as the municipalities of Calatrava, Enrique B. Magalona, Manapla, Salvador Benedicto and Toboso. Despite voters ratifying Batas Pambansa Blg. 885, on July 11, 1986, the Supreme Court declared the law and the proclamation of the province null and void. The ruling states the enabling law was unconstitutional for, among other things, not including the rest of Negros Occidental in the plebiscite, and the proposed province not meeting the 3,500 square kilometer land area requirement of the 1983 Local Government Code.
 Kalinga-Apayao (1966–1995) Divided into Apayao and Kalinga. Kalinga retained the provincial capital of Tabuk.
 Shariff Kabunsuan (2006–2008) Republic Act No. 9054 conferred to the Autonomous Region in Muslim Mindanao expanded powers, especially the capacity to create provinces (Article VI, Section 19). Based on this, the ARMM Regional Legislative Assembly enacted Muslim Mindanao Autonomy Act No. 201 on August 28, 2006. The Act created a new province, comprising all the municipalities in the first congressional district of Maguindanao (except Cotabato City), with its capital at Datu Odin Sinsuat. The province's creation was approved on October 28, 2006, by a majority vote in a plebiscite. Responding to requests for clarification as to which congressional districts form Shariff Kabunsuan for the 2007 elections (specifically whether Cotabato City was part of the representation of the new province), COMELEC issued Resolution No. 7845, which initially held Cotabato City to be the sole remaining LGU in the First District of Maguindanao. COMELEC later amended this with Resolution No. 7902, which maintained the status quo before the province's creation. The COMELEC resolutions became the subject of a case in which the Supreme Court opined that because "the power to create new a province or city inherently involves the power to create a legislative district"—a power that Congress did not explicitly delegate to the ARMM Regional Assembly—the creation of a province by a lower legislative body (the ARMM Regional Assembly) will necessarily entail the creation of a legislative district for a higher legislative body (Congress). Therefore, on July 16, 2008, the Supreme Court declared Section 19, Article VI of RA No. 9054 unconstitutional, MMA Act No. 201 void, and COMELEC Resolution No. 7902 valid.
 Maguindanao (1973–2022)Republic Act No. 11550 divided the province into Maguindanao del Norte and Maguindanao del Sur through a plebiscite. Maguindanao del Norte resembles the former province of Shariff Kabunsuan however adds the municipality of Sultan Sumagka into its territory. The capital of Maguindanao del Norte is Datu Odin Sinsuat while the capital of Maguindanao del Sur is Buluan.

Etymologies

History

Timeline 
When the United States acquired the Philippines from Spain in 1898, the islands were divided into four gobiernos (governments), which were further subdivided into provinces and districts. The American administration initially inherited the Spanish divisions and placed them under military government. As insurgencies were pacified, civil government was gradually organized.

1900–1901
 November 23, 1900 – Civil government of the province of Benguet established through Act No. 49. Capital moved to Baguio.
 February 6, 1901 – Act No. 83, or the Provincial Government Act, enacted by the Philippine Commission.
 February 13 – Provisions of the Provincial Government Act extended to Pampanga through Act No. 85.
 February 16 – Provisions of the Provincial Government Act extended to Pangasinan through Act No. 86. Towns of Balungao, Rosales, San Quintin and Umingan annexed from Nueva Ecija.
 February 18 – Provisions of the Provincial Government Act extended to Tarlac through Act No. 87.
 February 27 – Provisions of the Provincial Government Act extended to Bulacan through Act No. 88. Capital moved to Malolos.
 March 2 – Provisions of the Provincial Government Act extended to Bataan through Act No. 92.
 March 12 – Provisions of the Provincial Government Act extended to Tayabas through Act No. 103. Capital moved to Lucena.
 March 16 – Provisions of the Provincial Government Act extended to Romblon, elevated from Spanish-era status of District, through Act No. 104.
 March 18 – Provisions of the Provincial Government Act extended to Masbate, elevated from Spanish-era status of District, through Act No. 105.
 April 11 – Provisions of the Provincial Government Act extended to Iloilo, formed through the merging of the Spanish-era Province of Iloilo with the Comandancia of Concepcion, through Act No. 113.
 April 13 – Provisions of the Provincial Government Act extended to Antique through Act No. 114.
 April 15 – Provisions of the Provincial Government Act extended to Capiz through Act No. 115.
 April 18 – Provisions of the Provincial Government Act extended to Cebu through Act No. 116.
 April 20 – Provisions of the Provincial Government Act extended to Bohol through Act No. 117.
 April 22 – Provisions of the Provincial Government Act extended to Leyte through Act No. 121.
 April 26 – Provisions of the Provincial Government Act extended to Albay through Act No. 122.
 April 27 – Provisions of the Provincial Government Act extended to Ambos Camarines through Act No. 123.
 April 30 – Provisions of the Provincial Government Act extended to Sorsogon through Act No. 124.
 May 1:
 Provisions of the Provincial Government Act extended to Occidental Negros and Oriental Negros through Acts No. 119 and 120, respectively, enacted on April 20, 1901.
 Provisions of the Provincial Government Act extended to newly created Marinduque through Act No. 125.
 May 2 – Provisions of the Provincial Government Act extended to Batangas through Act No. 126.
 May 15:
 Provisions of the Provincial Government Act extended to Surigao, elevated from Spanish-era status of District, through Act No. 127.
 Provisions of the Provincial Government Act extended to Misamis through Act No. 128.
 June 11:
 Provisions of the Provincial Government Act extended to newly created Rizal, formed through the merging of the Politico-Military District of Morong with the entire province of Manila except the territory of the city of Manila, through Act No. 137.
 Provisions of the Provincial Government Act extended to Cavite through Act No. 138. Annexed Lubang and adjacent islands to the province. Provincial government provided an option to move capital from the town of Cavite.
 Provisions of the Provincial Government Act extended to Nueva Ecija through Act No. 139.  Provincial government provided an option to move capital from the town of San Isidro.
 July 16 – Catanduanes annexed to Albay through Act No. 169.
 July 17 – Batangas, Bohol and Cebu placed under the control of military governors through Act No. 173.
 August 15 – Provisions of the Provincial Government Act and its amendments extended to La Union through Act No. 203.
 August 16 – Provisions of the Provincial Government Act and its amendments extended to Ilocos Sur through Act No. 205.
 August 19 – Provisions of the Provincial Government Act and its amendments extended to Abra, excluding its territory east of the crest of the Cordillera Central, through Act No. 206.
 August 20 – Provisions of the Provincial Government Act and its amendments extended to Ilocos Norte through Act No. 207.
 August 22 – Provisions of the Provincial Government Act and its amendments extended to Cagayan through Act No. 209. The Babuyan Islands and the Spanish-era province of Batanes annexed to the province.
 August 24 – Provisions of the Provincial Government Act and its amendments extended to Isabela through Act No. 210.
 August 28 – Provisions of the Provincial Government Act and its amendments extended to Zambales through Act No. 211.

1902
 January 1 – Civil government of the Province of Cebu restored through Act No. 322 enacted on December 20, 1901.
 January 28 – Civil government of the Province of Nueva Vizcaya established through Act No. 337.
 April 1 – Civil government of the Province of Bohol restored through Act No. 365 enacted on March 3, 1902.
 May 28 – Spanish-era comandancias of Amburayan, Bontoc and Lepanto organized into sub-provinces under the new province of Lepanto-Bontoc through Act No. 410. Areas between Abra and Cagayan not yet placed under the jurisdiction of any province annexed as part of the sub-province of Bontoc.
 June 12 – Spanish-era districts of El Principe and Infanta, including the Polillo Islands, annexed to Tayabas through Act No. 417.
 June 17 – Provisions of the Provincial Government Act and its amendments extended to Samar through Act No. 419.
 June 23:
 Civil government of the Province of Paragua established through Act No. 422.
 Mindoro, Lubang and surrounding small islands annexed to Marinduque through Act No. 423.
 July 1 – Provisions of the Provincial Government Act and its amendments extended to La Laguna through Act No. 424.
 November 10:
 Marinduque annexed to Tayabas through Act No. 499.
 Provisions of the Provincial Government Act and its amendments extended to newly created Mindoro, separated from Marinduque through Act No. 500.

1903
 May 14 – Cagayancillo, Balabac and the rest of Palawan Island (south of Tapul and Ulugan rivers) annexed to Paragua through Act No. 747. Provincial government provided the option to choose capital between Cuyo or Puerto Princesa.
 May 26 – Spanish-era Comandancia of Kayapa annexed to Benguet through Act No. 768.
 July 15 – Moro Province formed, composed of the districts of Cotabato, Davao, Lanao, Sulu, and Zamboanga through Act No. 787 enacted on June 1, 1903.

1905
 April 1 – Abra annexed to Ilocos Sur as sub-province through Act No. 1306 enacted on February 27, 1905.
 April 19 – Catanduanes established as sub-province of Albay through Act No. 1331.
 June 28 – Name of Paragua changed to Palawan through Act No. 1363.

1906–1907
 January 1, 1906 – Masbate annexed to Sorsogon as sub-province through Act No. 1413 enacted on November 23, 1905.
 May 9, 1907 – Apayao and Kalinga established as sub-provinces of Cagayan and Lepanto-Bontoc, respectively, through Act No. 1642.
 July 15 – Romblon (except the island of Maestro de Campo, annexed to Mindoro) annexed to Capiz as sub-province through Act No. 1665 enacted on July 2, 1907.
 August 10 – Marinduque declared a sub-province of Tayabas through Act No. 1649 enacted on May 17, 1907.
 August 20 – Act No. 1693 creates Agusan (composed of the sub-provinces of Butuan and Bukidnon), and establishes Batanes as a sub-province of Cagayan.
 October 8 – Siquijor established as sub-province of Negros Oriental through Act No. 1753.

1908–1919
 August 18, 1908 – Mountain Province, with seven sub-provinces, formed by merging territories of the entire province of Lepanto-Bontoc (with Amburayan, Bontoc, Kalinga and Lepanto sub-provinces); the district in the province of Nueva Vizcaya that formerly the comprised the Spanish-era Comandancia of Quiangan (annexed as Ifugao sub-province); the entire province of Benguet except Baguio (annexed as Benguet sub-province); and Apayao sub-province in Cagayan, through Act No. 1876.
 May 20, 1909 – Batanes re-established as province, separated from Cagayan through Act No. 1952.
 December 20, 1913 – Act No. 2309 renames Moro Province to Department of Mindanao and Sulu and annexes Agusan (with Bukidnon sub-province) to the Department. Department of Mindanao and Sulu formally organized on January 1, 1914.
 September 1, 1914 – Department of Mindanao and Sulu provided with autonomous government through Act No. 2408 enacted on July 23, 1914. Bukidnon sub-province and the former Moro Province districts of Cotabato, Davao, Lanao, Sulu and Zamboanga converted to provinces.
 March 9, 1917 – Abra re-established as regular province, separated from Ilocos Sur through Act No. 2683.
 December 7, 1917 – Romblon re-established as regular province, separated from Capiz through Act No. 2724.
 March 3, 1919 – Ambos Camarines divided into Camarines Norte and Camarines Sur through Act No. 2809.

1920
 February 4
 Act No. 2877 abolishes Amburayan sub-province in Mountain Province by annexing its municipal entities to Ilocos Sur and La Union.
 Lepanto sub-province reduced in size by annexing some of its municipal entities to Ilocos Sur and Benguet.
 February 22 – Marinduque re-established as regular province, separated from Tayabas through Act No. 2880.
 December 15 – Masbate re-established as regular province, separated from Sorsogon through Act No. 2934.

1923–1939
 March 27, 1923 – Leyte divided into Occidental Leyte and Oriental Leyte through Act No. 3117, but never proclaimed by the governor-general.
 November 28, 1930 – Division of Misamis into Misamis Occidental and Misamis Oriental implemented by virtue of Act No. 3777, the law that amended Act No. 3537 (enacted on November 2, 1929), which first sought the division.
 June 8, 1940 – Provincial government of Romblon abolished, municipal governments reorganized into four "special municipalities" through Commonwealth Act No. 581.

1942
 January 1 – Executive Order No. 400 issued by Manuel L. Quezon creates the City of Greater Manila, composed of the chartered cities of Manila and Quezon City with the following municipalities from the province of Rizal: Caloocan, Makati, Mandaluyong, Parañaque, Pasay and San Juan.
 May 18 – Executive Order No. 42 issued by Jorge Vargas of the Japanese-era Philippine Executive Commission abolishes sub-provinces, annexing their municipalities to their respective provinces.
 August 31 – Executive Order No. 84 issued by Jorge Vargas abolishes the province of Batanes and annexes its municipalities to Cagayan; annexes the municipalities of Baler and Casiguran (corresponding to the entire present-day territory of Aurora) from Tayabas to Nueva Ecija; annexes the municipality of Infanta (including the present-day municipalities of General Nakar and Real) from Tayabas to Laguna; abolishes the province of Marinduque and annexes its municipalities to Tayabas; and abolishes the province of Romblon and annexes its special municipalities to Capiz.
 November 1 – Executive Order No. 103 issued by Jorge Vargas annexes the Polillo Islands from Tayabas to Laguna.

1945–1956
 August 1, 1945 – Executive Order No. 58 issued by Sergio Osmeña reduces the territory of the City of Greater Manila to only Manila and Quezon City, restoring Caloocan, Makati, Mandaluyong, Parañaque, Pasay and San Juan to Rizal. Republic Act No. 54 of October 10, 1946, later repealed Executive Order No. 400 (series 1942) and Executive Order No. 58 (series 1945), finally abolishing the City of Greater Manila and restoring the pre-war status of the chartered cities of Manila and Quezon City.
 October 26, 1945 – Catanduanes established as regular province, separated from Albay through Commonwealth Act No. 687 enacted on September 26, 1945.
 September 7, 1946 – Name of Tayabas changed to Quezon through Republic Act No. 14.
 October 1, 1946 – CA 581 repealed and Romblon's provincial and municipal governments restored through Republic Act No. 38.
 June 13, 1950 – Mindoro divided into Occidental Mindoro and Oriental Mindoro through Republic Act No. 505.
 June 14, 1951 – Aurora established as sub-province of Quezon through Republic Act No. 648.
 June 6, 1952 – Zamboanga divided into Zamboanga del Norte and Zamboanga del Sur through Republic Act No. 711.
 April 25, 1956 – Aklan separated from Capiz through Republic Act No. 1414.
 June 22, 1957 – Camiguin established as sub-province of Misamis Oriental through Republic Act No. 2021.

1959
 April 8 – Biliran established as sub-province of Leyte through Republic Act No. 2141.
 May 22 – Lanao province divided into Lanao del Norte and Lanao del Sur through Republic Act No. 2228.
 July 1 – Southern Leyte separated from Leyte through Republic Act No. 2227 approved on May 22, 1959.

1960–1969
 June 19, 1960 – Surigao divided into Surigao del Norte and Surigao del Sur through Republic Act No. 2786.
 November 9, 1965 – Plebiscite approves the division of Samar into Eastern Samar, Northern Samar, and Western Samar by virtue of Republic Act No. 4221 enacted on June 19, 1965.
 June 18, 1966
 Guimaras established as sub-province of Iloilo through Republic Act No. 4667.
 Camiguin established as regular province, separated from Misamis Oriental through Republic Act No. 4669.
 Benguet re-established, and Ifugao and Kalinga-Apayao created, from Mountain Province through Republic Act No. 4695.
 Quirino established as sub-province of Nueva Vizcaya through Republic Act No. 4734.
 South Cotabato separated from Cotabato through Republic Act No. 4849.
 May 8, 1967 – Davao province divided into Davao del Norte, Davao del Sur, and Davao Oriental through Republic Act No. 4867.
 November 14, 1967 – Plebiscite approves the division of Agusan into Agusan del Norte and Agusan del Sur by virtue of Republic Act No. 4979 enacted on June 17, 1967.
 June 21, 1969 – Name of Western Samar province changed to Samar through Republic Act No. 5650.
 August 4, 1969 – Samal sub-province created from Davao del Norte through Republic Act No. 5999, but never inaugurated.

1971–1998
 October 4, 1971 – Maranaw province created from Lanao del Sur through Republic Act No. 6406, remained unorganized due to the disruption caused by the declaration of Martial Law in the Philippines.
 November 11, 1971 – Plebiscites approve the establishment of Quirino and Siquijor as regular provinces by virtue of Republic Act No. 6394 (approved on September 10, 1971) and Republic Act No. 6398 (approved on September 17, 1971), separating them from Nueva Vizcaya and Negros Oriental, respectively.
 June 17, 1972 – Name of Davao del Norte changed to Davao through Republic Act No. 6430.
 September 11, 1973 – Tawi-Tawi separated from Sulu through Presidential Decree No. 302.
 November 22, 1973 – Cotabato divided into Maguindanao, North Cotabato, and Sultan Kudarat through Presidential Decree No. 341.
 December 27, 1973 – Basilan province created through Presidential Decree No. 356 out of most of the territory of the City of Basilan, which itself was delimited to only the downtown area of what is now Isabela City, then finally abolished by Presidential Decree No. 840 in 1975.
 November 7, 1975 – Metro Manila established through Presidential Decree No. 824, composed of the four chartered cities of Manila, Caloocan, Pasay and Quezon City, and several municipalities of Rizal and Bulacan, all of which effectively became independent from provincial supervision.
 August 13, 1979 – Aurora proclaimed a regular province, separated from Quezon through Batas Pambansa Blg. 7 enacted on November 21, 1978. Plebiscite held on May 20, 1979, approves provincehood.
 March 7, 1984 – Name of North Cotabato province changed to Cotabato through Batas Pambansa Blg. 660.
 January 3, 1986 – Plebiscite approves the separation of Negros del Norte from Negros Occidental by virtue of Batas Pambansa Blg. 885 enacted on December 3, 1985.
 August 18, 1986 – BP No. 885 found unconstitutional by the Supreme Court, Negros del Norte reverts as part of Negros Occidental.
 May 11, 1992 – Plebiscites affirm the establishment of Biliran and Guimaras as regular provinces, separating them from Leyte and Iloilo, respectively, by virtue of Section 462 of Republic Act No. 7160 (Local Government Code of 1991) approved on October 10, 1991.
 November 28, 1992 – Plebiscite approves the separation of Sarangani from South Cotabato by virtue of Republic Act No. 7228 approved on March 16, 1992.
 May 8, 1995 – Plebiscite approves the division of Kalinga-Apayao into Apayao and Kalinga by virtue of Republic Act No. 7878 approved on February 14, 1995.
 March 7, 1998 – Plebiscite approves the separation of Compostela Valley from Davao by virtue of Republic Act No. 8470 approved on January 30, 1998. Name of Davao changed back to Davao del Norte.

2001–present
 February 22, 2001 – Plebiscite approves the separation of Zamboanga Sibugay from Zamboanga del Sur by virtue of Republic Act No. 8973 approved on November 7, 2000.
 October 28, 2006 – Plebiscite approves the separation of Shariff Kabunsuan from Maguindanao by virtue of Muslim Mindanao Autonomy Act No. 201 enacted on August 28, 2006.
 December 2, 2006 – Plebiscite approves the separation of Dinagat Islands from Surigao del Norte by virtue of Republic Act No. 9355 approved on October 2, 2006.
 November 18, 2008 – MMA Act No. 201 declared void by the Supreme Court, Shariff Kabunsuan reverts as part of Maguindanao.
 February 11, 2010 – RA No. 9355 found unconstitutional by the Supreme Court, Dinagat Islands reverts as part of Surigao del Norte.
 March 30, 2011 – Supreme Court reverses its decision on Dinagat Islands and became a province once again.
 October 28, 2013 – Plebiscite approves the separation of Davao Occidental from Davao del Sur by virtue of Republic Act No. 10360 approved on January 21, 2013.
 December 8, 2019 – Name of Compostela Valley changed to Davao de Oro through Republic Act 11297 approved on April 17, 2019.
 September 18, 2022 – Plebiscite approves the division of Maguindanao into Maguindanao del Norte and Maguindanao del Sur by virtue of Republic Act No. 11550 approved on May 27, 2021.

Gallery

Formally proposed/renamed provinces

Proposed provinces with enacted law 

 Occidental Leyte and Oriental Leyte (1923)Leyte was divided into two new provinces by Act No. 3117 on March 27, 1923. The division never took place, however, as no proclamation was issued by the Governor-General.
 The province of Oriental Leyte would have covered the present-day territories of the entire province of Biliran, the municipalities of Abuyog, Alangalang, Babatngon, Barugo, Burauen, Calubian, Capoocan, Carigara, Dagami, Dulag, Jaro, Javier, Julita, La Paz, Leyte, MacArthur, Mahaplag, Mayorga, Palo, Pastrana, San Isidro, San Miguel, Santa Fe, Tabango, Tabontabon, Tanauan, Tolosa, Tunga and Tacloban (which was designated as the provincial capital).
 The province of Occidental Leyte would have covered the present-day territories of the entire province of Southern Leyte, the municipalities of Albuera, Bato, Hilongos, Hindang, Inopacan, Isabel, Kananga, Matag-ob, Matalom, Mérida, Palompon, Villaba and the cities of Baybay and Ormoc. The province capital of Occidental Leyte "SEC. 2. ... shall be designated by the Governor-General, until determined by a plurality vote of the electors of the new province at the next general election."
 Samal (1969)The sub-province of Samal was created by Republic Act No. 5999 and covered the area of the present-day Island Garden City of Samal. However, the sub-province was never inaugurated.
 Maranaw (1971)Republic Act No. 6406, which sought to create a new province out of eastern Lanao del Sur (now corresponding to the province's first congressional district), was approved on October 4, 1971. The province was to consist of the municipalities of Bubong, Ditsaan-Ramain (including what is now Buadiposo-Buntong), Kapai, Lumba-Bayabao (including what is now Maguing), Marantao, Masiu, Mulondo, Saguiaran, Piagapo, Poona Bayabao, Tamparan, Taraka and Wao (including what is now Bumbaran), with the chartered city of Marawi serving as the new province's capital. Lanao del Sur was to retain the remaining municipalities, with Malabang serving as its new capital. Section 4 of RA 6406 provided that "The new provinces as provided in this Act shall come into existence upon the election and qualification of their first elective provincial officials, who shall be elected in a special election simultaneously with the general elections of November, nineteen hundred and seventy-three." The division never took place due to the declaration of martial law in the Philippines on September 21, 1972, which disrupted the scheduled general elections for 1973 and paved the way for the adoption of a new Constitution and the establishment of the Fourth Philippine Republic. A legacy of this unimplemented division is the existence of two ZIP code series for Lanao del Sur: the 93- series was retained by what were to be the remaining towns of the province (with Malabang, the new capital, being reassigned the code 9300), while a new series (97-) was assigned to what was supposed to be the province of Maranaw (with Marawi getting the new code 9700).

Rejected in a plebiscite 
 Isabela del Norte and Isabela del Sur (1995)On February 20, 1995, Republic Act No. 7891, which sought to divide the province of Isabela, was approved. Isabela del Norte was to comprise municipalities belonging to the province's first and second congressional districts with Ilagan serving as capital. Isabela del Sur was to consist of the third and fourth congressional districts (excluding the independent component city of Santiago), with Cauayan as the capital. The proposed division was rejected in a plebiscite held on June 20, 1995.
 Quezon del Norte and Quezon del Sur (2007)The act dividing the province of Quezon into two, Republic Act No. 9495, lapsed into law without the President's signature on September 7, 2007. Quezon del Norte (which would be renamed from Quezon) was to be composed of the first and second congressional districts of the province, with Lucena as its capital. Quezon del Sur, with its capital at Gumaca, would have been composed of the third and fourth congressional districts. The COMELEC held the plebiscite on December 13, 2008, and the majority of the votes rejected the division.
 Palawan del Norte, Palawan Oriental, and Palawan del Sur (2021) On April 5, 2019, President Rodrigo Duterte signed Republic Act No. 11259 that proposed the division the province of Palawan, with the exception of the independent city of Puerto Princesa, into three separate provinces. A plebiscite was originally scheduled for the second Monday of May 2020 but was postponed to March 2021 due to the COVID-19 pandemic. Palawan del Norte would have been composed of Taytay and municipalities north of it. Palawan del Sur would have been composed of the municipalities west and south of Puerto Princesa, including Kalayaan (which administers the country's claims in the Spratly Islands), while the rest were proposed to form Palawan Oriental. The proposed provincial capitals would be Taytay (Palawan del Norte), Brooke's Point (Palawan del Sur), and Roxas (Palawan Oriental). The COMELEC held the plebiscite on March 13, 2021, and the majority of the votes rejected the division.

Other proposed provinces 
 Surigao Oriental (2022): House Bill No. 2336 seeks to carve a province out of the six southernmost local government units of Surigao del Sur province. Bislig and the municipalities of Barobo, Hinatuan, Lingig, and Tagbina all comprise the district of the bill's author, Surigao del Sur 2nd District Representative Johnny T. Pimentel; the bill also seeks to transfer Lianga, currently part of the First District, to the proposed province. Bislig would be the designated capital. The bill is pending with the Committee on Local Government since August 2, 2022.
 Northwestern Samar (2019)  House Bill No. 8824 was introduced in the House of Representatives on January 22, 2019, by Representative Edgar Mary Sarmiento to establish a new province called Northwestern Samar, consisting of 9 municipalities of which Calbayog would be the designated capital.
 Zamboanga Hermosa (2017) On February 21, 2017, House Bill No. 5040 was introduced in the House of Representatives that seeks to carve out a new province from Zamboanga del Norte, consisting of the 12 municipalities and 2 legislative districts that make up the 3rd legislative district of Zamboanga del Norte.

Proposed renaming 
 Southern Leyte to Leyte del Sur (2017) – House Bill No. 6408 proposed to change the name of the province to Leyte del Sur. Representative Roger Mercado authored the bill to enhance the identity of the province as it is geographically part of the island of Leyte with a distinct personality of its own. The bill did not prosper as it was left pending in the Committee on Local Government since September 20, 2017, until the end of the 17th Congress.

See also 
 List of Philippine provinces by population
 List of Philippine provincial etymologies
 List of Philippine provinces by Human Development Index
 List of demonyms for Philippine provinces
 ISO 3166-2:PH
 Sub-provinces of the Philippines, a defunct group of administrative divisions in the Philippines

Notes

References

External links 

 Philippine Standard Geographic Code Interactive, National Statistical Coordination Board
 The 2010 Census of Population and Housing Reveals the Philippine Population at 92.34 Million, Philippine Statistics Authority, Republic of the Philippines
 Provinces of the Philippines, Gwillim Law, Statoids.com
 Flags of the WorldPhilippines Provincial Flags

Philippines 2
Provinces, Philippines
 
Provinces
Philippines geography-related lists
 
Subdivisions of the Philippines